The 2008 Trinidad and Tobago Classic was the fourth season of the TOYOTA Classic, which is a knockout tournament competition for teams in the TT Pro League and the National Super League. The tournament took place at the conclusion of the 2008 season. Joe Public entered as the tournament's defending champion.

Qualification

Every club from the TT Pro League automatically qualified for the competition. In addition, following the conclusion of the National Super League season, the top five teams ranked according to the league table qualified. All teams entered the competition at the first round.

The draw for the first round for the fourth edition of the tournament was conducted by Pro League CEO Dexter Skeene on 26 November 2008, at the Constantine Stand, Queen's Park Oval. The 16 teams in the competition, valued at TT$150,000 in total sponsorship, were drawn into four groups, all named after TOYOTA branded vehicles, Terios (Group A), Sirion (Group B), Delta (Group C), and Daihatsu (Group D). All clubs were seeded based on their positions in their respective leagues.

W Connection, Caledonia AIA, San Juan Jabloteh, and Joe Public of the TT Pro League were drawn as the top seeds in Groups A, B, C, and D, respectively.

The following clubs have qualified for this year's edition of the TOYOTA Classic:

Schedule
The schedule for the 2008 TOYOTA Classic, as announced by the TT Pro League and National Super League:

Bracket

Results
All matches were played over two 45 minutes halves, and in the process if the match were drawn at the end of regulation time, penalty kicks determined the winner.

First round
The tournament commenced on 1 December, with all 16 teams competing in single elimination matches. Despite having the chance to upset a club from the Pro League, each Super League team lost in the first round. Tobago United provided the only upset of the round, when the Tobago Boys topped Defence Force in Group C. All other higher-seeded teams advanced to the quarterfinals with little difficulty.

Quarterfinals
In the quarterfinals, top-seeded clubs W Connection and Joe Public were ousted from the competition following defeats to North East Stars and St. Ann's Rangers, respectively. On the other side of the bracket, San Juan Jabloteh and Caledonia AIA both advanced easily as both Pro League sides did not concede a goal during the round.

Semifinals
One week after the quarterfinals, on 12 December, St. Ann's Rangers continued their run through the tournament with a 1–0 win over fellow Pro League side North East Stars. San Juan Jabloteh also advanced to the final with a victory against Caledonia AIA.

Third place
In the consolation match-up, Caledonia AIA narrowly defeated North East Stars 6–5 on penalty kicks, after the match ended 2–2 in regulation, to claim the competition's third place.

Final
In the final, San Juan Jabloteh claimed their first TOYOTA Classic title with a 2–1 win over St. Ann's Rangers using goals from Jason Marcano and Trent Noel. Conrad Smith used a brace in Caledonia AIA's victory in the first round to eventually end as the tournament's leading goal scorer with four goals.

References

External links
Official Website

2008 TOYOTA Classic
Trinidad and Tobago Classic
Classic